Ami Maayani (January 1936 – February 17, 2019) was an Israeli composer. The founder and conductor of the Israel National Youth Orchestra, the Tel Aviv Youth Orchestra, the Haifa Youth Orchestra and the Technion Symphony Orchestra, from 1970 to 1973 and 1976–1980 he was the chairman of the Israel Composers' League. Of note is Maayani's Concerto for Guitar and Orchestra, Qumran and Serenade in D. Zvi Keren in his book Contemporary Israeli music: its sources and stylistic development (1980) said "The works of Ami Maayani, which have formed a continuation and extension of this school, have a style which might be described as post-Eastern-Mediterranean." The American Organist said, "The lush improvisatory elements and Arabic modal influences in the music of Ami Maayani complement the pandiatonic polyphony of Yuval Rabin. Sabin Levi, on the other hand, employs minimalism and Sephardic folklore."

Ami Maayani died of cancer on 17 February 2019, at age 82.

References

External links
Official site

Israeli classical composers
1936 births
2019 deaths
Israeli conductors (music)
Musicians from Tel Aviv
20th-century conductors (music)
21st-century conductors (music)
Male classical composers
Male conductors (music)
20th-century classical composers
21st-century classical composers
20th-century Israeli male musicians
21st-century Israeli male musicians